Candy-O is the second studio album by American rock band the Cars, released on June 13, 1979 by Elektra Records. Produced by Roy Thomas Baker, the album spawned two singles, "Let's Go" (number 14 on the Billboard Hot 100) and "It's All I Can Do" (number 41). The album outperformed the band's debut, peaking at number three on the US Billboard 200. The cover art was done by pin-up artist Alberto Vargas.

Background 
Unlike the first album, Candy-O was created under a more democratic approach. Ric Ocasek said of this, "When one of my songs goes to the band in barest cassette form, we sit around and talk about it. If I'm outvoted, we don't do it. We almost didn't include 'Double Life' on the new album, it had been dropped. I think everybody in the Cars is open-minded and creative enough that they would do anything – nobody's holding anything back. Everybody appreciates the more radical, experimental kinds of music and likes it. But sometimes, when you're put together with five pieces, things are not as minimal as they could or should be. Everybody's developed a unique personal style, and we rely on their input. If they did it, it's good enough."

Most of the songs on Candy-O were written after the release of The Cars, meaning that most of the leftovers from the first album (including the popular encore "Take What You Want") were scrapped; "Night Spots", a reject from the first album, was still included.

For the album, the band once again worked with Queen producer Roy Thomas Baker. Ocasek said of their relationship with the producer, "Well, some of the things on that first album that we thought were a little slick, we toned down on the second, like on the background vocals. But if we were going to rely on the producer we had hired, there was no reason to try and change him. On the second album, it was easier to say, 'Roy, let's not do the multi-tracked harmonies this time.

The band's label, Elektra, initially wanted to hold back the release of the album, but the band stood their ground. Ocasek said of this, "At first Elektra wanted to hold it back some, but we told them there was no way, because if they were going to hold that back, they were going to hold us back, and we can't just sit around and be held back." Released as the follow-up to their 1978 debut album The Cars, Candy-O peaked at number three on the Billboard 200. The album re-entered the charts at number 179 in 1984. The record was also ranked number 82 on Billboards "Top Albums of the Year" chart for 1979.

Three singles were lifted from Candy-O: "Let's Go" reached number 14, making it the first top-20 Cars single, "It's All I Can Do" peaked at number 41, barely missing the top 40, and "Double Life" failed to chart.

Cover art 
The album cover was painted by artist Alberto Vargas, who was known for his paintings of pin-up girls that appeared in Esquire and Playboy magazines in the 1940s through the 1960s. The idea to hire Vargas came from drummer David Robinson, the band's artistic director and a collector of pin-ups. The 83-year-old Vargas had retired several years earlier but was persuaded to take the assignment by his niece, who was a fan of the Cars. The painting, depicting a woman sprawled across the hood of a Ferrari 365 GTC/4, was based on a photo shoot directed by Robinson at a Ferrari dealership. The model, coincidentally named Candy Moore, briefly dated Robinson afterward.

Candy Moore 
Candy Moore, a model and actress who appeared in the 1981 movie Lunch Wagon, is often confused with an actress of the same name who starred in The Lucy Show and married actor Paul Gleason. The case of incorrect identity is pervasive throughout the Internet, having the Lucy Show actress often linked to, and credited with, the work of the model found on the Cars' album. The Candy Moore from the cover of the Candy-O album can also be found wearing a red shirt on the cover of Rick James' album Street Songs, and on subsequent sleeves for his singles such as "Ghetto Life". Other shots of the model during the Candy-O cover shoot, can be found in a video interview with David Robinson.

Reception 

Candy-O was positively received by critics. Harry Sumrall of The Washington Post praised the album as "invigorating and enlightening" and found that Ocasek's songs possessed a "certain adolescent charm" while avoiding "any direct allusions to '50s rock 'n' roll." Village Voice critic Robert Christgau summarized the album as follows: "Cold and thin, shiny and hypnotic, it's what they do best—rock and roll that is definitely pop without a hint of cuteness". Rolling Stone writer Tom Carson was more reserved in his praise, writing, "It's almost inevitable that Candy-O, the Cars' second album, doesn't seem nearly as exciting as their first. The element of surprise is gone, and the band hasn't been able to come up with anything new to replace it. Candy-O is an elaborately constructed, lively, entertaining LP that's packed with good things. And it's got a wonderful title. But it's a little too disciplined, a shade too predictable."

In a retrospective review, AllMusic critic Greg Prato said that while Candy-O "was not as stellar" as The Cars, "it did contain several classics, resulting in another smash album that solidified the band's standing as one of the most promising new bands of the late '70s." Hamish Champ, writer of The 100 Best-Selling Albums of the 70s, said: "With UK producer Roy Thomas Baker once again behind the decks, Ric Ocasek and his colleagues produced a follow-up to their hugely successful debut with more of the same quirky, offbeat songs that had caused such a stir the first time around."

Track listing

Personnel 
Credits adapted from the liner notes of Candy-O.

The Cars 
 Ric Ocasek – vocals, rhythm guitar
 Benjamin Orr – vocals, bass guitar
 Greg Hawkes – keyboards, percussion, sax, backing vocals
 David Robinson – drums, percussion
 Elliot Easton – lead guitar, backing vocals

Technical 
 Roy Thomas Baker – production
 Geoff Workman – engineering
 George Tutkov – engineering assistance
 George Marino – mastering at Sterling Sound (New York City)

Artwork 
 Ron Coro – art direction, design
 Johnny Lee – art direction, design
 David Robinson – cover concept
 Alberto Vargas – cover painting
 Jeff Albertson – photography

Charts

Weekly charts

Year-end charts

Certifications

References

Bibliography 

 

1979 albums
Albums produced by Roy Thomas Baker
The Cars albums
Elektra Records albums